Alexander Bryson,  (1802–1869) was a Scottish naval surgeon and medical writer. He was educated at Edinburgh and Glasgow, entered the Royal Navy as assistant-surgeon in 1827, and rose to become director-general of the naval medical department in 1864.

Life 
Alexander Bryson began his professional studies at Edinburgh and continued them at Glasgow, where he took his doctor's degree and was admitted a member of the Faculty of Physicians and Surgeons. He also became a fellow of the Royal College of Physicians, London. He entered the Royal Navy as assistant-surgeon in 1827, and was promoted to the rank of surgeon in 1836, deputy inspector-general in 1854, and inspector-general in 1855. In January 1864, on the retirement of Sir John Liddell, he was appointed director-general of the medical department of the Navy, from which post he retired on 15 April 1869. He was appointed honorary physician to Queen Victoria in 1859, and subsequently he was made a companion of the Order of the Bath. He was also a fellow of the Royal Society. His death took place at Barnes, Surrey, on 12 December 1869.

Works 
He was the author of a treatise on The Climate and Diseases of the African Station, and of An Account of the Origin, Spread, and Decline of the Epidemic levers of Sierra Leone, London, 1849, 8vo. For a long time he was the head of the department of naval medical statistics, and he compiled the Statistical Reports on the Health of the Navy. He also contributed an article "On Medicine and Medical Statistics" to the Admiralty Manual of Scientific Enquiry.

References

Sources 

 

Attribution:

Further reading 

 Brown, G. H. (1955). "Bryson, Alexander, C.B." In Lives of the Fellows of the Royal College of Physicians of London, 1826–1925. Vol. 4. London: The Royal College of Physicians. pp. 126–127.
 Haultain, Charles (1840). The New Navy List. London: Simpkin, Marshall and Co. pp. 168, 220.
 Sheridan, Richard B. (1981). "The Guinea Surgeons on the Middle Passage: The Provision of Medical Services in the British Slave Trade". The International Journal of African Historical Studies, 14(4): pp. 601–625. JSTOR.
 Wickenden J. V. S. (2010). "Watching over Jack: Alexander Bryson, 1802-1869". Journal of the Royal Naval Medical Service, 96(1): pp. 45–53. .
 "Alexander Bryson". RCP Museum. Royal College of Physicians. Retrieved 5 October 2022.
 "The Royal Navy, &c." The Morning Post. 15 August 1836. p. 2.
 "Appointments". The Hampshire Advertiser. 18 January 1845. p. 5.
 "Appointments". The Morning Post. 2 March 1854. p. 4.
 "Naval and Military Intelligence". The Times. 16 December 1869. p. 10.
 "Obituary. / A. Bryson". The British Medical Journal. 18 December 1869. p. 670.
 "Obituary. / Dr. Alexander Bryson". The Lancet, 94(2416). 18 December 1869. pp. 860–861.

1802 births
1869 deaths
Scottish medical writers
Naval surgeons